The 2008 Sydney Roosters season was the 101st in the club's history. They competed in the NRL's 2008 Telstra Premiership and finished the regular season 4th out of 16. Despite losing their first finals match, the Roosters got another chance the following week but were knocked out by the New Zealand Warriors.

Ladder

Squad

The following players are contracted to the Sydney Roosters for the 2008 season.

Player Movement

The Roosters have had a rather significant amount of player movement which will result in an extensive squad change from the 2007 season. The Roosters have lost 10 players from their 2007 squad and gained 4 new players, including high-profile signings Willie Mason and Mark O'Meley.

Gains

Losses

2008 results

Player Summary

References

External links
 Sydney Roosters Official Website

Sydney Roosters seasons
Sydney Roosters season